Chay Qeshlaqi (also Romanized as Chāy Qeshlāqī; also known as Chāy Qeshlāq) is a village in Oryad Rural District, in the Central District of Mahneshan County, Zanjan Province, Iran. At the 2006 census, its population was 133, in 28 families.

References 

Populated places in Mahneshan County